Luca Bottale (born 1 July 1967) is an Italian voice actor who contributes to voicing characters in movies, cartoons, anime, video games, and more. He is well known for voicing characters from popular TV programs such as Usopp from One Piece, Zane Truesdale from Yu-Gi-Oh! GX, and more. Bottale is also known for voicing Sly Cooper in the 1st three games of the Sly Cooper video game series.

Currently, he works for Merak Film, Deneb Film, Studio P.V. and other dubbing studios based in Italy.

Voice work

Animation and anime
 Kain in Fire Emblem Anime
 Judeau in Berserk
 Dinosaur Ryuzaki in Yu-Gi-Oh! Duel Monsters
 Ryo Marufuji and Ojama Yellow in Yu-Gi-Oh! Duel Monsters GX
 Yeager and Saiga in Yu-Gi-Oh! 5D's
 Tetsuo Takeda in Yu-Gi-Oh! Zexal
 Johnny in Stoked
 Kankuro in Naruto
 Kankuro in Naruto: Shippuden
 Detective Cash Tankinson and other characters in The Batman
 Dr. Roberto Martinez in Max Steel
 Thomas Richard Schubaltz in Zoids: Chaotic Century
 Sparky (Second voice) in Atomic Betty
 Aquaman in Justice League
 Barry the Chopper in Fullmetal Alchemist
 Number 66 in Fullmetal Alchemist: Brotherhood
 Lowly Worm in The Busy World of Richard Scarry (Second dub)
 Lowly Worm in Busytown Mysteries
 Bot in Team Umizoomi
 Bumble in Fifi and the Flowertots
 Darwin Thornberry in The Wild Thornberrys
 Ryder in Sarah Lee Jones
 Athenina in Trulli Tales 
 Dib in Invader Zim
 Cedric in Butt-Ugly Martians
 Brock in Pokémon (Season 3-present)
 Brock in Pokémon: Destiny Deoxys
 Brock in Pokémon: Lucario and the Mystery of Mew
 Brock in Pokémon Ranger and the Temple of the Sea
 Brock in Pokémon: The Rise of Darkrai
 Brock in Pokémon: Giratina and the Sky Warrior
 Brock in Pokémon: Arceus and the Jewel of Life
 Brock in Pokémon: Zoroark: Master of Illusions
 Usopp in One Piece
 Usopp in One Piece: The Movie'''
 Usopp in Clockwork Island Adventure Usopp in Chopper's Kingdom on the Island of Strange Animals Usopp in One Piece The Movie: Dead End no Bōken Usopp in One Piece: Norowareta Seiken Usopp in Baron Omatsuri and the Secret Island Usopp in Giant Mecha Soldier of Karakuri Castle Pleakley in Stitch! Bobby Lee in Odd Job Jack Nicky in VeggieTales James Jones in Fireman Sam (2004 series)
 George Kojima in Detective Conan (Season 2-present)
 Constable Klang in Pippi Longstocking Rabbit in Franklin and Friends Worm Raimi in Saint Seiya Yutaka Watari in Descendants of Darkness John in Tomodachi Life: The TV Series Ichitaro Ishikawa in Corrector Yui Seiya Uribatake in Martian Successor Nadesico: The Motion Picture – Prince of Darkness Horohoro in Shaman King Toguro Otouto, Sakashita, Jin (first voice), and Shishiwakamaru in YuYu Hakusho Valet 6 in Alpen Rose (second dub)
 Finko in Pink Panther and Sons Gian in Doraemon (Second dub)
 Hippo in Mermaid Melody Pichi Pichi Pitch Gas in Angels Friends Kazuki Sendō in Comic Party Tetsuya Watarigani in Beyblade: Metal Fusion Mr. Cake and Snails in My Little Pony: Friendship Is Magic Zig in Zig & Sharko Blocky in ChalkZoneLive action films and shows
 Oscar in True Jackson, VP Jack Sawyer in Tremors 3: Back to Perfection Charlie in The Brotherhood IV Jason Lee Scott in Mighty Morphin Power Rangers Jason Lee Scott in Power Rangers Zeo Jason Lee Scott in Turbo: A Power Rangers Movie Zhane in Power Rangers in Space Prince Malik Namir in Jake 2.0 Rob Gretton in 24 Hour Party People Richard "Woody" Woodford in This Is EnglandVideo games
 Eddie Brock/Venom in Ultimate Spider-Man (video game) Sly Cooper in Sly Cooper and the Thievius Raccoonus Sly Cooper in Sly 2: Band of Thieves Sly Cooper in Sly 3: Honor Among Thieves Nick Scryer in Psi-Ops: The Mindgate Conspiracy Varimathras, Bloodfeather, and other characters in Warcraft III: The Frozen Throne Neeloc Greedyfingers, and other characters in Warcraft III: Reign of Chaos Malvaren, Icarus, and other characters in Avencast: Rise of the Mage Tom, Harry, and other characters in The Black Mirror Broken Sword: The Sleeping Dragon Price, Powell, and Stolls in The Thing Phoenix Wright in Professor Layton vs. Phoenix Wright: Ace Attorney''

References

External links
 
 
 
 

Living people
Male actors from Milan
Italian male voice actors
1967 births